The Republic of Ireland has qualified to the FIFA Women's World Cup in one occasion, the 2023 FIFA Women's World Cup which will also be the country's debut.

FIFA Women's World Cup overviews

FIFA Women's World Cup

Participation history

Australia/New Zealand 2023

References

 
World Cup
Countries at the FIFA Women's World Cup